The 1962–63 Scottish League Cup was the seventeenth season of Scotland's second football knockout competition. The competition was won Heart of Midlothian, who defeated Kilmarnock in the Final.

First round

Group 1

Group 2

Group 3

Group 4

Group 5

Group 6

Group 7

Group 8

Group 9

Supplementary Round

First Leg

Second Leg

Quarter-finals

First Leg

Second Leg

Semi-finals

Final

References

General

Specific

League Cup
Scottish League Cup seasons